Sultan Ahmad Shah I ibni Almarhum Sultan Mansur Shah (died 1519) was the second Sultan of Pahang who reigned from 1475 to 1495. He succeeded on the death of his younger brother who was poisoned in 1475. During his reign, relations between Pahang and its Melakan overlord, deteriorated greatly, as a result of his personal resentment towards his half-brother Alauddin Riayat Shah. Under his rule, Pahang became increasingly unstable and he abdicated around 1495, in favour of his son, Raja Mansur.

Personal life
Sultan Ahmad was known as Raja Ahmad before his accession. He was the eldest of the two sons of the sixth Sultan of Melaka, Mansur Shah by his wife Putri Wanang Sri Lela Wangsa, daughter of Dewa Sura, the last Pre-Melakan ruler of Pahang, who was also a relative of the King of Ligor. Both his mother and grandfather were captured and presented to the Sultan of Melaka after the conquest of Pahang in 1454.

In 1470, his younger brother Raja Muhammad was banished from Melaka for committing murder, and was installed as the Sultan of Pahang. Soon afterwards, Raja Ahmad also left Melaka for Pahang after being installed as heir to the Pahang throne by his father. It is highly speculated that this appointment was a consolation after he had been passed over from the succession to the Melakan throne. His younger half brother, Raja Husain was installed as the heir instead. This event led to his resentment towards his half-brother, culminating the future cold relations between both states during his reign.

Sultan Ahmad married a daughter of Bendahara Tun Hamzah, and by her, had issued a son, Raja Mansur.

Reign
Bustanus Salatin records that Raja Ahmad succeeded his younger brother Muhammad who, according to the Portuguese records, died of poisoning in 1475. Two years later in 1477, following the death of their father Mansur Shah, his half brother, Raja Husain ascended the Melakan throne and took the title Alauddin Riayat Shah. Relations between Melaka and Pahang deteriorated shortly after his accession. 

The Malay Annals narrates the event when Sultan Ahmad became furious after learning that, the head of the neighboring Terengganu chieftaincy, Tun Telanai, had recognised the overlordship of Melaka and paid his obeisance to Sultan Alauddin, without his knowledge. On the return of Tun Telanai to Terengganu, he was murdered by the head of Pahang Hulubalang, Seri Akar Raja, who later established his control over the chieftaincy. The family of Tun Telanai complained the matter to Sultan Alauddin, who later viewed the murder as an insult aimed directly at him. He promptly wished to go to war with Pahang but later calmed by his ministers. Alauddin later succeeded in exacting his reprisal when a Melakan mission to Pahang, attacked and killed a cousin of Seri Akar Raja. 

In 1488, Sultan Alauddin died at Pagoh on the Muar river. Rumours spread that the Sultan was assassinated by poisoning, and among those implicated was the ruler of Pahang himself. The other potential perpetrators also includes the chief of Inderagiri, Raja Merlang, who lived in Melaka and had married Raja Bakal, the half-sister of Sultan Alauddin. Sultan Alauddin was succeeded by his son Mahmud Shah who, because of the rumours surrounding the death of his father, had developed strong animosity towards his royal uncle in Pahang. He would later become directly involved in a conflict with Sultan Ahmad, when he ordered the abduction of a beautiful Pahang noblewoman, Tun Teja, who was betrothed to the Pahang ruler. Tun Teja was eventually won over and brought to Melaka to wed Sultan Mahmud.

Abdication
Sultan Ahmad bore the slights and insults from Melaka with rancour, and particularly took umbrage of Mahmud Shah's abduction of Tun Teja. Helpless to avenge and shamed beyond endurance before his subjects, he abdicated in favour of his very young son, Raja Mansur. The new ruler was placed under the guardianship of his cousins, the three sons of Muhammad Shah. In describing Ahmad Shah's life after the abdication, the Malay Annals noted: "his highness went upstream for so long as the royal drums could be heard; when he came to Lubuk Pelang (in present day Jerantut constituency) there he resided, and the sound of the drums was no longer heard. He went into religious seclusion; he it is whom people call Marhum Syeikh.

These events took place around 1495. Accounts in the Malay Annals relates it to the reign of Sultan Abdul Jamil instead of Sultan Ahmad, but scholars are in agreement that it was Sultan Ahmad who actually went into religious seclusion, and died at Lubuk Pelang where his possible unnamed tomb is located. Sultan Abdul Jamil (also pronounced 'Abdul Jalil'), on the other hand, is believed to have reigned and died at Pekan, instead of Lubuk Pelang, based on the discovery of a tombstone with his name at Makam Ziarat Raja Raden, Pekan.

Centuries later in 1862, the shrine of Marhum Syeikh at Lubuk Pelang became the location where Wan Ahmad, the future Sultan Ahmad of modern Pahang, took his vows before routing the remaining of Tun Mutahir forces in the Pahang Civil War.

References

Bibliography
 
 
 
 
 

1512 deaths
15th-century Sultans of Pahang
Monarchs who abdicated